Oxyropsis is a genus of fish  in the family Loricariidae native to South America. These species are distinguished by the presence of a single row of enlarged odontodes along the trunk midline lying adjacent and immediately dorsal to, the lateral line canal. Species of this genus have a depressed head and have relatively large eyes placed ventrolaterally. This genus is most similar to Hypoptopoma in external appearance, which shares the head shape and eye placement. Oxyropsis are elongate and have a narrow caudal peduncle, which distinguishes it from all other Hypoptopomatinae genera except Niobichthys and Acestridium.

The species of Oxyropsis are distinguished based on their armor plate formation, numbers of plates and teeth, relative depth of the caudal peduncle, development of serrae on the pectoral fin spine. Males have a genital papilla.

Species
There are currently 3 recognized species in this genus:
 Oxyropsis acutirostra P. Miranda-Ribeiro, 1951
 Oxyropsis carinata (Steindachner, 1879)
 Oxyropsis wrightiana C. H. Eigenmann & R. S. Eigenmann, 1889

References

Hypoptopomatini
Fish of South America
Catfish genera
Taxa named by Rosa Smith Eigenmann
Taxa named by Carl H. Eigenmann
Freshwater fish genera